Aubrey Mellor  is an Australian theatre director, dramaturge and teacher.

Mellor has had a multi-disciplinary practice, having also worked as a writer, adapter, set designer, translator, producer, and stage manager.

Early life and training 
Brought up around variety and circus, Mellor trained in many fields as a young man. His experience traversed dance, music and visual art. He went on to graduate from a production course at the National Institute of Dramatic Art (NDIA) in Sydney in 1969.

In 1972 Mellor was awarded a Churchill Fellowship. This experience allowed Mellor to study the traditional theatre of the East with a view to incorporating principles observed in Japan where appropriate into the Australian theatre techniques.

Artistic direction 
Mellor has directed a wide rage of performance from opera to dance and film, and held multiple artistic directorships during his career.

Mellor was the Artistic Director of the Jane Street Theatre, which grew out of NIDA. 

He was Co-Artistic Director of Nimrod Theatre Company in Sydney for a short time in the early 1980s. He was Artistic Director of the (Royal) Queensland Theatre Company from 1988 to 1993.  He was also Artistic Director at Playbox (later renamed Malthouse Theatre) in Melbourne until 2004.

Education appointments 
Aubrey is well known as an acting teacher across the Asia Pacific region.

Mellor returned to NIDA as Director in 2005, succeeding John Clark after his nearly forty years in the role. Mellor stayed at NIDA until 2007.

He was then Dean of the Performing Arts Schools at Lasalle in Singapore where he designed a new program bringing together the best European and Asian training.  He was a Senior Fellow with Lasalle until 2017.

Mellor continues his teaching work as a visiting professor to arts colleges in Mongolia, China, Japan, Vietnam, Indonesia and India.

Awards 

In 2004 Mellor received an AWGIE (Australian Writers' Guild) special award known as the 'Dorothy Crawford Award'. This prize is awarded for outstanding contribution to the writing profession.

Mellor was the recipient of the International Theatre Institute's 'Uchimura Prize', for best production at the Tokyo International Festival.

Aubrey is listed in the Matilda Awards Hall of Fame for his contribution to the theatre industry in Queensland.

Honours
Aubrey was awarded an Order of Australia Medal in 1992 for his service to the arts.

References 

Living people
Year of birth missing (living people)
Australian theatre directors
Recipients of the Medal of the Order of Australia
National Institute of Dramatic Art alumni